Valmadrera railway station is a railway station in Italy. Located on the Como–Lecco railway, it serves the municipality of Valmadrera in Lombardy. The train services are operated by Trenord.

Train services 
The station is served by the following service(s):

Milan Metropolitan services (S7) Milan – Molteno – Lecco
Lombardy Regional services (R18) Como – Molteno – Lecco

See also 
 Milan suburban railway network

References 

Railway stations in Lombardy
Milan S Lines stations
Railway stations opened in 1888